Rolando Alberto Argueta-Molina (born August 13, 1971) is a Salvadoran actor.

Life and Career

Molina was born in El Salvador and immigrated to the United States at a very young age. The family settled in Los Angeles. Approached by Edward James Olmos while working as a security guard at Universal Studios one day; Rolando caught Olmos' attention and asked him to audition for his new film. His acting début was (a cameo) on Olmos' project at the time; American Me (1992). He has also been in other films such as Menace II Society (1993), Mojave Moon (1996), The Rich Man's Wife (1996), Next Friday (2000), Crazy/Beautiful (2001), Party Animalz (2004) and Six Thugs (2006). He also made guest appearances in Desperate Housewives as the biological father of Gabrielle Solis's legal daughter Juanita.

Filmography

Film/Movie

Television

References

External links

1971 births
Living people
American male film actors
American male television actors
Hispanic and Latino American male actors
People from San Salvador
Salvadoran emigrants to the United States